Alfred A. Yuson, also known as Krip Yuson (born 1945), is a Filipino author of novels, poetry and short stories.

Career
Early in his career, Yuson received a writing fellowship to attend the National Writers Workshop in Dumaguete in 1968. Yuson also has a Filipino Academy of Movie Arts and Sciences Award and a Catholic Mass Media Award (CMMA) Award for Best Screenplay. He has been a documentary filmmaker and scriptwriter, as well as a book, magazine and newspaper editor and designer. In 1988, he collaborated with cinematographer Ernesto Enrique on the documentary A Filipino Pilgrimage to Medjugorje, produced by Troika Video Productions, which was broadcast on ABS-CBN on March 24, 1988. Yuson was also a Fellow at the International Writing Program in Iowa City, U.S. in 1978; the International Poetry Conference at the University of Hawaii in 1979; the Cambridge Seminar, University of Cambridge, in 1989; the International Writers Retreat at Hawthornden Castle in Midlothian, Scotland, in 1990; The Hong Kong International Literary Festival in 2001 and 2006; and the Sydney Writers' Festival in 2006. He has also participated in many other literary conferences, seminars and festivals in Japan, China, Finland, Scotland, Thailand, Malaysia, South Africa, the United Kingdom, Australia and Singapore.

He is a founding member of the Philippine Literary Arts Council, Creative Writing Foundation, Inc. and Manila Critics Circle, and is currently Chairman of the Writers Union of the Philippines. He also serves as Philippines Editor for MANOA: A Pacific Journal of International Writing, published by the University of Hawaii . A documentary filmmaker and scriptwriter, he is a board member of the Movie and Television Ratings and Classification Board in the Philippines.

Yuson currently writes a literature and culture column for The Philippine Star. He also teaches fiction and poetry at Ateneo de Manila University, where he holds the Henry Lee Irwin Professorial Chair in Creative Writing. His two novels, The Great Philippine Jungle Café and Voyeurs & Savages are studies of Philippine culture.

Awards and nominations
His works have won several literary distinctions, the most recent of which include the Patnubay ng Sining at Kalinangan (Stalwart of Art and Culture) award from the City of Manila in June 2003, and a Rockefeller Foundation grant for residency at the Bellagio Center in Italy in 2003.

Yuson was conferred with the S.E.A. Write Award in 1992 for lifetime achievement, and has been elevated to the Hall of Fame of the Carlos Palanca Memorial Awards for Literature, the Philippines' most prestigious literary distinction.

"The Music Child" by Alfred A. Yuson is among 5 works shortlisted for the second (2008) Man Asian Literary Prize, which was announced at a Hong Kong ceremony on November 13, 2008.

Writings
His bibliography includes the poetry collections: Sea Serpent, (Monsoon Press, 1980), Trading in Mermaids (Anvil Publishing, Inc., 1993), Mothers Like Elephants ( Anvil Publishing, Inc., 2000), Hairtrigger Loves: 50 Poems on Woman (University of the Philippines Press, 2002), and the translation, Love's A Vice / Bisyo and Pag-Ibig: Translations into English of 60 Poems by Mike L. Bigornia (National Commission for Culture and the Arts, 2004).

References

External links
Read "Luhod Lang" by Krip Yuson
Manoa Winter 1997 by Yuson and Gamalinda
Luto, Linis, Laba
The Word on Paradise
La Escaleras del Cielo, Alfred A. Yuson, escritor filipino
AEI Motion Picture Production and Literary Management

1945 births
20th-century essayists
20th-century Filipino poets
20th-century male writers
20th-century short story writers
21st-century essayists
21st-century Filipino poets
21st-century male writers
21st-century short story writers
Filipino children's writers
Filipino editors
Filipino essayists
Filipino male poets
Filipino male short story writers
Filipino short story writers
Filipino novelists
International Writing Program alumni
Living people
Palanca Award recipients
S.E.A. Write Award winners